Senator Lamb may refer to:

Floyd Lamb (1914–2002), Nevada State Senate
Norman Lamb (American politician) (1935–2018), Oklahoma State Senate
Thomas F. Lamb (1922–2015), Pennsylvania State Senate
Todd Lamb (politician) (born 1971), Oklahoma State Senate